Baba Rostam may refer to:
 Baba Rostam, Hamadan
 Baba Rostam, Kermanshah
 Baba Rostam, Kurdistan